Dantidurga (reigned 735–756 CE), also known as Dantivarman II was the founder of the Rashtrakuta Empire of Manyakheta. His capital was based in Gulbarga region of Karnataka. His successor was his uncle Krishna I who extended his kingdom to all of Karnataka.

The Ellora record of Dantidurga narrates that he defeated the Chalukyas in 753 and took the titles Rajadhiraja and Parameshvara. The inscription calls him son of Indra II. The Samangad inscription (modern Kolhapur district, Maharashtra) states his mother was a Chalukyan princess from Gujarat called Bhavanaga. The same inscription states he defeated the infinite and invincible Karnatata-Bala (Karnataka army) of the Badami Chalukyas. Further he defeated the kings of Lata (Gujarat), Malwa, Tanka, Kalinga and Sheshas (Nagas) in central India and performed many sacrifices. Though he conquered the Chalukyan Empire, it is clear from the Vakkaleri inscription of 757 that the Chalukyan Emperor Kirtivarman II retained control over his southern provinces up to the year 757. His daughter was married to a Pallava King Nandivarman II of Kanchi. Dantidurga helped Nandivarman recover Kanchi by warring against the Chalukyas.

The Navasari grant (c.739) throws light on his achievements in the era prior to Rashtrakuta independence. The Arab intention might have been to make inroads into South India. However, to the south of the Mahi River lay the powerful Chalukyan empire. The Chalukya viceroy at Navsari, Avanijanashraya Pulakeshin, decisively defeated the invading Arab forces as documented in the grant. The Tājika (Arab) army defeated was one that had attacked "Kacchella, Saindhava, Saurashtra, Cavotaka, Maurya and Gurjara" kings. Viceroy Pulakesi subsequently received the titles "Solid Pillar of Deccan" (Dakshināpatha-sādhāra) and the "Repeller of the Unrepellable" (Anivartaka-nivartayitr). The Rashtrakuta prince Dantidurga, who was subsidiary to Chalukyas at this time, also played an important role in the battle.
Dantidurga was a clever diplomat but at the same time used military power to expand his empire's boundaries. By 750 AD Dantidurga had brought Madhya Pradesh and Southern Gujarat under his control.

Notes

References

External links
 History of Karnataka, Mr. Arthikaje

756 deaths
Hindu monarchs
History of Karnataka
Rashtrakuta dynasty
8th-century Indian monarchs